WUPE (1110 kHz) is a commercial AM radio station in Pittsfield, Massachusetts.  It is owned by Townsquare Media and it simulcasts the classic hits format of 100.1 WUPE-FM.  WUPE serves the Berkshire Mountains area.  The station is a daytimer and must sign off the air at sunset, according to Federal Communications Commission rules.

By day, WUPE transmits with 5,000 watts, using a directional antenna, but because 1110 AM is a clear channel frequency reserved for KFAB Omaha and WBT Charlotte, WUPE must be off the air at night, when radio waves travel further.  Programming is also heard in Pittsfield on FM translator W277CJ at 103.3 MHz.  That gives listeners three spots on the dial to hear WUPE, AM 1110, FM 100.1 and FM 103.3.

History
It was progressive rock WGRG. WGRG became Top 40 WUPE in 1977. WUPE became WUHN, playing adult standards in the early 1980s. The format was flipped to oldies in 1990, and then to country music in 1996. The WUPE call letters were restored along with the oldies format in 2006.

In August 2013, Gamma Broadcasting reached a deal to sell its Berkshire County radio stations, including WUPE, to Reed Miami Holdings; the sale was canceled on December 30, 2013. In August 2015, WUPE added an FM translator in the Pittsfield area. In October 2016, Gamma agreed to sell its stations to Galaxy Communications; that sale also fell through, and in 2017 the stations were acquired by Townsquare Media.

Translators

References

External links

UPE
Classic hits radio stations in the United States
Pittsfield, Massachusetts
Mass media in Berkshire County, Massachusetts
Radio stations established in 1971
Townsquare Media radio stations
1971 establishments in Massachusetts
UPE